Hiram Wilkinson may refer to:

Sir Hiram Shaw Wilkinson, British lawyer, diplomat and judge
Hiram Parkes Wilkinson KC, British lawyer and judge (and son of Hiram Shaw Wilkinson)